Phtheochroa frigidana is a species of moth of the family Tortricidae. It is found in Spain, Andorra, France, Italy, Albania and Bosnia and Herzegovina.

The wingspan is 18–24 mm. Adults have been recorded on wing from April to July.

References

Moths described in 1845
Phtheochroa